This is a list of electoral division results for the Australian 1984 federal election for the Australian Capital Territory and the Northern Territory.
__toc__

Australian Capital Territory

Canberra

Fraser

Northern Territory

Northern Territory

See also 
 Results of the 1984 Australian federal election (House of Representatives)
 Members of the Australian House of Representatives, 1984–1987

References 

Territories 1984